The 2022–23 Biathlon World Cup – Stage 6 was the third event of the season and was held in Antholz-Anterselva, Italy, from 19 to 22 January 2023.

Schedule of events 
The events took place at the following times.

Medal winners

Men

Women

References 

Biathlon World Cup - Stage 6, 2022-23
2022–23 Biathlon World Cup
Biathlon World Cup - Stage 6
Biathlon competitions in Italy